There are 14 Holdridge life zones in Guatemala:

References 

Geography of Guatemala
Guatemala geography-related lists
Biogeographic realms